Krishno is the debut album of Bangladeshi music producer, Habib Wahid released in 2003 under the Ektaar record label. The album consists of folk songs sang by Kaya.

Track listing

References 

2003 albums
Habib Wahid albums
Krishna in popular culture